Buzeyir cave – is an archaeological site and Paleolithic place of human habitation.

The cave was discovered in 1985, during an archaeological expedition in the Lankaran, Lerik and Masally Rayons under the guidance of A.Jafarov. Items made of stone and sharpened bones of animals from the Paleolithic were unearthed during subsequent archaeological excavations.

History 
As a result of the archaeological exploration in the Zuvandcai Valley, caves and mountain shelters were discovered. The territory of the Lerik region is the Talysh Ridge along the border with Iran, followed by the Peshtasar Range in the north, and then the Burovar Range. The Zuvan pool is located between the Talish and Peshtasar ranges. The highest peaks are Kemyurga (2493 m) and Gyzyurdudur (2433 m). The Talysh Mountains, formed mainly during the third geological period, are the continuation of the Small Caucasus. In contrast to the Small Caucasus, volcanic caves were formed in the Talysh Mountains. The tops of Talish mountains are completely naked. Vegetation is mostly rare forests, wooded meadows and mountain forests. During archaeological research, several caves were discovered on the 9th kilometer of the Lerik-Zuvand road. The Buzeir Cave is located on the 9th kilometer of the Lerik-Buseir road, on the left bank of the Zuvandchay River, 3 km east of the village of Buzeir. The length of the cave is 12 meters, its width is 5-6 meters, and its height is 2.5 meters (from the soil sediment).  There were large stones fallen from the roof at the front of the cave before the excavations started.

Archaeological investigations 
Scientific researches of the average paleolithic camps in Azerbaijan provide information on the way of life of people living here, instrument  as sharp knives, curry-combs for making and hunting economy, as well as on the Neanderthal type of population during the culture of Moustier.

During the archaeological excavations carried out in the cave, stones and hunting bones of animals dating from the Paleolithic period were found. About 74 archaeological excavations were discovered in the cave Buzeir. 

In stone products, clawed cores, simple knuckles, one-eyed white handkerchiefs, scales and boards were found. As a result of archaeological research conducted in the territory of the Republic of Azerbaijan from 1953 to 2003, the caves of Azykh (III layer), Taglar, Dashsalakhly, Damchi, Kazma and Buzeir, related to the Middle Paleolithic and Mousterian cultures were studied and studied.

Within the framework of Intas 2000 programme, European scholars such as Henry de Lumley conducted scientific research in Buzeyir cave in September-October 2002. 

The archaeological expedition led by Asadulla Jafarzadeh (Javarov) discovered five archaeological layers for the first time here. 

During the archaeological excavations of the Paleolithic archaeological expedition in 1985, 1990 and 2007, six layers of archaeological excavations were recorded in Buzeyr's multi-layer camp.

The first layer consists of the black earth layer. Medieval, bronze age and eneolithic clay dishes were found. The layer thickness was 5-7 cm. 

The second layer consists of a layer of yellow glycine. During the archaeological excavations carried out on the second layer, numerous bronze age, eneolithic and medieval clay dishes  were found. The thickness of the second layer is 40-45 cm. 

The third layer consists of a layer of grayish-yellow clay. Remains of animal hunting bones and 6 stone products were found inside the layer. The thickness of this layer was 32-35 cm.

The fourth layer consists of a layer of gray soil. The thickness of the formation was 25-30 cm.

The fifth layer is a layer of dark yellow soil. Single remains of rocks, 12 bone fractures and 23 stone products  were found in the structure of the formation. The thickness of this layer was 50-55 cm.

The sixth layer consists of a light yellow sand layer. The sixth layer consisted of rocks falling from the ceiling of the caves. The thickness of the described given was 35-40 cm. 

According to Asadulla Jafarzadeh, the discovery of the cave of Buzeyir proves that the ancient paleolithic man inhabited 60-80 thousand years ago here. 

According to Hajiyev's scientific-archeological research, neandertal type of people have hunted 15 species of animals in Buzeyir cave.

See also 
Mousterian culture 

History of Azerbaijan

References 

Caves of Azerbaijan
Paleoanthropological sites
Prehistoric sites in Azerbaijan
Archaeological sites in Azerbaijan